The island cowfish (Acanthostracion notacanthus) is a species of ray-finned fish within the family Ostraciidae. The species occurs in the eastern Atlantic near Azores, Saint Helena and Ascension Island, Ghana, and Angola, with some individuals reported from Sao Tome Island. It lives in shallow waters 3-25 meters below the ocean surface over rocks, rubble, sand, and on shallow reef substrate near islands. It grows to a length of 50 centimeters.

Conservation 
The island cowfish has been classified as a 'Data deficient' species by the IUCN Red List due to a lack of information regarding the species. No conservation efforts have been made towards the species, although its range does overlap with several marine protected areas.

References 

Fish described in 1863
IUCN Red List data deficient species
Acanthostracion
Fish of the Atlantic Ocean